NEADS may refer to:
Northeast Air Defense Sector
NEADS Inc., formerly the National Education for Assistance Dog Services

See also 
 Nead (disambiguation)